Pitcairnia foliacea is a plant species in the genus Pitcairnia. This species is endemic to Mexico.

References

foliacea
Flora of Mexico